Alvarenga may refer to:

People with the surname
Alvarenga Peixoto (1744–1793), pen name Eureste Fenício, colonial Brazilian neoclassic poet and lawyer
Abraham Alvarenga Urbina (born 1974), Honduran lawyer and politician
Carlos Alvarenga (born 1982), Paraguayan footballer
Cesar Diaz Alvarenga (fl. 1998–2009), rapper with hip-hop group Pescozada
Fabricio Alvarenga (born 1996), Argentine footballer
Fernanda Alvarenga (born 1986), Brazilian competitive swimmer
Guido Alvarenga (born 1970), nicknamed El Mago, Paraguayan football player
Herculano Marcos Ferraz de Alvarenga (born 1947), Brazilian scientist
José Salvador Alvarenga (born 1975), Salvadoran fisherman and castaway
Manuel Inácio da Silva Alvarenga (1749–1814), Brazilian poet
Mauricio Alvarenga (born 1951), nicknamed Tarzan, Salvadoran footballer
Reiver Alvarenga (born 1978), Venezuelan judoka
Sandra Alvarenga (fl. 2009–2010), drummer with rock band Black Veil Brides

Places
Alvarenga, Minas Gerais, a Brazilian municipality
Alvarenga (Arouca), a Portuguese community
Estádio Onésio Brasileiro Alvarenga, a stadium in Goiânia, Brazil

Other Uses
Alvarenga (fly), a robber fly in the family Asilidae

Portuguese-language surnames